Keble College, one of the colleges of the University of Oxford, was established by public subscription in 1868 as a memorial to the clergyman John Keble. He was one of the leaders of the Oxford Movement, whose members were often called "Tractarians"; they aimed to reform the Church of England by reasserting its links with the early Catholic church.  The college was incorporated by royal charter dated 6 June 1870. Under its terms, the governance of the college was in the hands of the Warden (the head of the college) and a council of nine to twelve members; the Warden could veto almost any decision of the council and so was in a strong position. Other Oxford colleges, in contrast, were run by the head of the college and the Fellows. By keeping matters relating to religion and the college's internal affairs in the hands of the council, rather than college academics (termed Tutors at Keble during this period), the founders hoped to maintain Keble's religious position as "a bastion of 'orthodox' Anglican teaching" against the opponents of Tractarianism. The council even had power to move the college away from Oxford (subject to the consent of the Visitor, the Archbishop of Canterbury) if it transpired that Oxford was not a suitable home.

In total, 54 men served on the council, 11 of whom were college alumni; in 1903, Arthur Winnington-Ingram (Bishop of London) became the first former Keble student to join the council. Appointment was for life or until resignation rather than for a fixed term; the council had power to fill vacancies. The first members were drawn from the committee of the Keble Memorial Fund whose work had raised the money to build the college.  The council met three times per year, including a meeting on St Mark's Day (25 April) – this was not only John Keble's birthday but the date on which the foundation stone was laid in 1868, and so was adopted by the college for commemorations and celebrations.

Most of the members of the council came from outside the college, and many did not have other continuing links with the university. It has been described as "an external Council of ecclesiastical worthies".  There were often arguments during meetings about the future direction of the college when Edward Stuart Talbot was Warden (from the college's foundation until 1888). Over time, the Tutors came to have a greater influence on the direction of the college, a change recognised in 1930 when the council ceded control of internal administration and academic matters to the Warden and Fellows (as the Tutors were then retitled).  It retained management of finances and ecclesiastical patronage, until Harry Carpenter (Warden from 1939 to 1955) persuaded the council to transfer its remaining powers to the Warden and Fellows. This placed the college "on a constitutional par with the older colleges of the University." The council ceased to exist after 9 April 1952, the date on which new statutes of the college that placed full management in the hands of the Warden and Fellows were approved by the Queen in Council.

Council members

Key
Those members of the council who were Old Members of the college are marked in colour and with (OM) after their name: Cyril Garbett (OM).
All academic appointments are at the University of Oxford, unless otherwise stated.

References
General references

Drennan, pp. 17–18.

Specific references

Bibliography

Lists of people associated with the University of Oxford
Council